Dotha is a genus of moths in the subfamily Arctiinae. It contains the single species Dotha ctenuchoides, which is found in Sumatra.

References

Natural History Museum Lepidoptera generic names catalog

Lithosiini